2020 SO is a near-Earth object identified to be the Surveyor 2 Centaur rocket booster launched on 20 September 1966. The object was discovered by the Pan-STARRS 1 survey at the Haleakala Observatory on 17 September 2020. It was initially suspected to be an artificial object due to its low velocity relative to Earth and later on the noticeable effects of solar radiation pressure on its orbit. Spectroscopic observations by NASA's Infrared Telescope Facility in December 2020 found that the object's spectrum is similar to that of stainless steel, confirming the object's artificial nature. Following the object's confirmation as space debris, the object was removed from the Minor Planet Center's database on 19 February 2021.

Overview
As it approached Earth, the trajectory indicated the geocentric orbital eccentricity was less than 1 by 15 October 2020, and the object became temporarily captured on 8 November when it entered Earth's Hill sphere. It entered via the outer Lagrange point  and will exit via Lagrange point . Since discovery the time of uncertainty for February 2021 closest approach to Earth was reduced from ±3 days to less than 1 minute. It left Earth's Hill sphere at around 8 March 2021.

Paul Chodas of the Jet Propulsion Laboratory suspects 2020 SO of being the Surveyor 2 Centaur rocket booster, launched on 20 September 1966. The Earth-like orbit and low relative velocity suggest a possible artificial object. Spectroscopy may help determine if it is covered in white titanium dioxide paint. Goldstone radar will make bistatic observations transmitting from the 70-meter DSS-14 and receiving at the 34-meter DSS-13. As a result of the bistatic DSS-14/RT-32 radar observations, a rotation period of about 9.5 seconds was obtained, which corresponds to the photometric observations. Obtained range-Doppler radar images confirm that the object has an elongated shape with a length of about 10 meters and a width of about 3 meters.

Around the time of closest approach on 1 December 2020, the object was only brightened to about apparent magnitude 14.1, and required a telescope with roughly a 150mm (6") objective lens to be seen visually. It displays a large light curve amplitude of 2.5 magnitudes, signifying a highly elongated shape or albedo variations on its surface. It has a rotation period of approximately 9 seconds.

At the time of its discovery, 2020 SO had unremarkable motion typical of a main-belt asteroid. However, the four observations that Pan-STARRS obtained over the course of 1.4 hours showed non-linear motion due to the rotation of the observer around Earth's axis, which is a signature of a nearby object.

See also 
 J002E3 – a near-Earth object discovered in 2002 that was identified as the S-IVB third stage of the Apollo 12 Saturn V rocket
 WT1190F – temporarily orbiting space debris that entered Earth's atmosphere in 2015
  – an artificial object discovered in a temporary orbit around Earth in 2018, now suspected to be the Snoopy module from Apollo 10
 6Q0B44E – another artificial object discovered in orbit around Earth in 2018
 Space debris
 Temporary satellite

Notes

References

External links 
 "Pseudo-MPEC" for 2020 SO = Surveyor 2 Centaur, Bill Gray, Project Pluto, 31 January 2021
 Earth May Have Recaptured a 1960s-Era Rocket Booster, Tony Greicius, NASA, 12 November 2020
 Animation of the Line of Variation (via clone orbits) stretching out from December 2020 to May 2021
 01 Dec 2020 image and rotation – Virtual Telescope Project / G. Masi
 01 Dec 2020 time-lapse and photometry – Virtual Telescope Project / G. Masi
 

Minor planet object articles (unnumbered)

Claimed moons of Earth
Space debris
20200917
20200917